The Boulton Paul P.112 was an elementary trainer designed by Boulton Paul Aircraft for the Royal Air Force.

Design and development
The P.112 was developed from the successful Boulton Paul Balliol, an advanced trainer powered by a Rolls-Royce Merlin piston engine, sharing the same fuselage as the Balliol but with new high aspect ratio wings and a non-retractable spatted undercarriage of  track. The trainer was equipped with three seats, similar to the Balliol and looked so like the earlier aircraft that the image in the brochure was actually a retouched Balliol T.1. However, the Royal Air Force preferred the smaller de Havilland Canada DHC-1 Chipmunk to the P.112 and so no production ensued.

Variants
P.112Baseline design for the elementary trainer, powered by an Alvis Leonides LE.4M
P.112AThe same design equipped with a Pratt & Whitney R-1340 Wasp engine. This and the Balliol T.2A, were the only Boulton Paul aircraft offered with American engines.

Specifications (P.112)

See also

References

P.112
1940s British military trainer aircraft
Single-engined tractor aircraft
Low-wing aircraft